The Union Underground is an American nu metal band based out of San Antonio, Texas. Original band members included Bryan Scott, Patrick Kennison, John Moyer and Josh Memolo. They released one major label album, ...An Education in Rebellion, in 2000 which featured the hit single "Turn Me On 'Mr. Deadman'.

History

1996–2002: ...An Education in Rebellion and break-up 
The roots of heavy metal band the Union Underground lie in the relationship between singer/guitarist Bryan Scott and guitarist Patrick Kennison, who met in junior high school in San Antonio, Texas. After finishing high school, the two launched their own recording studio, Studio Underground, making cassettes of their music. Sales of 5,000 copies of an EP brought interest from Hollywood rock manager James Jeda, who brought the band out of obscurity by signing them with Portrait Records, the hard rock imprint of Sony's Columbia label. Scott and Kennison completed the band's lineup with the addition of drummer Josh Memolo and bassist John Moyer.

The Union Underground released its debut album, ...An Education in Rebellion, on July 18, 2000. The disc spent four months on the charts and the track "Turn Me On 'Mr. Deadman was on the mainstream rock charts for six months. After two years, the album's sales reportedly stood at 350,000. The band opened for Marilyn Manson in the fall of 2000 and earned a slot on the 2001 Ozzfest tour.

In March 2002, The Union Underground released the song "Across the Nation" which was used by the World Wrestling Federation, now known as World Wrestling Entertainment, as the theme song for their RAW brand until October 2006. Following the song's release, it earned extensive airplay nationwide.

On June 25, 2002, the band released Live...One Nation Underground, a compilation of live performances. This would be their final release before Portrait folded in 2002 and The Union Underground disbanded.

Leader singer Bryan Scott teamed up with UU former manager James Jeda again in 2007 to start a new project "Cult to Follow" with an entirely new band. Their music can be found on You tube.

2016-present: Reformation and upcoming second studio album 
In early 2016, Scott announced via the band's Facebook page that a new lineup and music would be available that summer, with a sample of a track ("False Caterpillars") available for 24 hours only. Later in the year it was announced that an EP would be released in 2017. In 2018, a video announcing that new album details were 'coming soon' appeared on the band's YouTube channel. But no official release has surfaced yet.

On February 4, 2020, the band announced that they would play the entirety of their debut album ...An Education in Rebellion in full, along with songs from the upcoming album, at the Aztec Theatre in San Antonio, Texas, on July 18, but the show was canceled due to Covid-19.

Post-Union Underground projects 
Patrick Kennison is now working with the band Heaven Below. 
John Moyer is now playing bass for Disturbed and Adrenaline Mob. 
Josh Memolo became a born again Christian and father of two children. He has played drums in different churches and for local bands when he can. 

Bryan Scott started the band Cult to Follow. In July 2015 it was announced that Bryan Scott (vocals) formed a side project called Into the Fire with Tim King (bass) and Adam Zadel (guitar) from the band SOiL and also features Will Hunt of [Evanescence] on drums. Into the Fire released a self-titled EP on September 30, 2016.

Members 
 Bryan Scott – lead vocals, rhythm guitar
 Patrick Kennison – lead guitar, backing vocals
 John Moyer – bass, backing vocals
 Josh Memelo – drums

Discography

Studio albums

Other releases

Charted singles

Radio promotion CDs
 Rebellion (2000)
 Killing the Fly (2000)
 Live – Club Laga, Pittsburgh, PA 2000-07-29 (2000)
 Turn Me On Mr. Deadman (2001)
 South Texas Deathride (2001)
 Revolution Man (2001)
 Across the Nation (2002)

Soundtrack appearances
 "South Texas Deathride" on Ozzfest 2001: The Second Millennium
 "Across the Nation" on WWF Forceable Entry

References 

American nu metal musical groups
Columbia Records artists
Musical groups from San Antonio
Heavy metal musical groups from Texas
Musical groups established in 1996
Musical groups disestablished in 2002
Musical groups reestablished in 2016
Musical groups reestablished in 2020
Musical quartets